The Church of Jesus Christ of Latter-day Saints in Papua New Guinea refers to the Church of Jesus Christ of Latter-day Saints (LDS Church) and its members in Papua New Guinea (PNG).  The first missionaries arrived in 1980. As of December 31, 2021, there were 35,033 members in 87 congregations, making it the largest body of LDS Church members in Melanesia and the fifth largest in Oceania.

History

Stakes & districts
As of February 2023, the following stake and districts exist in PNG:

The following congregations are not part of a stake or district
Alotau Branch (Port Moresby Mission)
Kiunga Branch (Port Moresby Mission)
Papua New Guinea Lae Mission Branch
Papua New Guinea Port Moresby Mission Branch
The Papua New Guinea Lae Mission Branch and the Papua New Guinea Port Moresby Mission Branch serves individuals and families that are not in proximity of a meetinghouse.

Missions

Temples
The Port Moresby Papua New Guinea Temple was announced on October 5, 2019 by church president Russell M. Nelson.

See also
Religion in Papua New Guinea

References

External links
 The Church of Jesus Christ of Latter-day Saints (Papua New Guinea) - Official Site
 The Church of Jesus Christ of Latter-day Saints (Pacific) - Official Site
 The Church of Jesus Christ of Latter-day Saints - Pacific Newsroom
 ComeUntoChrist.org Latter-day Saints Visitor site

Religion in Papua New Guinea
 
Papua New Guinea